is a train station on the Kyoto Municipal Subway Karasuma Line in Shimogyo-ku, Kyoto, Japan.

The station is located beneath Karasuma Street, at the intersection with Shijō Street. The underground concourse of Shijō Station is connected with the underground concourse of Karasuma Station on the Hankyu Kyoto Line under Shijō Street.

Lines
 
 (Station Number: K09)

Layout
The station has an island platform serving two tracks.

References

Railway stations in Kyoto Prefecture